Mansan may refer to:

Toponyms
Mansan, Burma
Mansan, Hautes-Pyrénées, a commune in the Hautes-Pyrénées department in France
Mān San, Burma
Mānsān, Burma
Mansan River, a tributary of the Maicasagi River, in Québec, Canada